The Gohrisch (wrongly also called the Gohrischstein, 440 m) is a table hill in the German region of Saxon Switzerland, left of the River Elbe in Saxony.

Location and surrounding area 
The Gohrisch is located about four kilometres southeast of Königstein and some four kilometres south of Bad Schandau in the centre of a plateau (Ebenheit) that is dominated by similar rocky hills. It is surrounded by the hills of the Papststein, the Kleinhennersdorfer Stein and the Lasensteine. Touristically this micro-region in Saxon Switzerland is often called the "Region of Rocks" (Gebiet der Steine).

At the foot of the Gohrisch lie the small villages of Kurort Gohrisch and Papstdorf, which belong to the municipality of Gohrisch. On the east side is the Speckstein Gallery (Specksteinstollen) which bears witness to former prospecting in this area. In the immediate vicinity there is a small, overgrown quarry where basalt used to be extracted for used as road ballast.

References

Sources 
 Bernd Ullrich, Dieter Kutschke: Historische und Mineralogische Aspekte des Bergbauversuchs am Gohrisch ("Specksteinstollen") im Elbsandsteingebirge (Sachsen), in: Geologica Saxonica 52/53(2007), S. 69-90 (Digitalisat)

External links 
 Website of the municipality of Gohrisch
 Die touristische Erschließung des Gohrischsteins
 Photos

Mountains of Saxon Switzerland
Elbe Sandstone Mountains
Hills of Saxony